The 1971 Arkansas State Indians football team represented Arkansas State University as a member of the Southland Conference during the 1971 NCAA College Division football season. Led by first-year head coach Bill Davidson, the Indians compiled an overall record of 4–4–1 with a mark of 1–3–1 in conference play, placing fifth in the Southland.

Schedule

References

Arkansas State
Arkansas State Red Wolves football seasons
Arkansas State Indians football